Indiscreet is the fifth album by Sparks. It was released in 1975 and later re-released with three bonus tracks. The album was a departure from the glam rock sound of Kimono My House and Propaganda, and emphasised the theatrical elements of their work, with greater use of orchestral arrangements and drawing from non-rock orientated styles such as jazz, big band, swing, vaudeville, and classical music. The album was produced by Tony Visconti, with whom the group reunited in 1997 to produce several tracks for their retrospective album Plagiarism. The song "How Are You Getting Home?" was used in Leos Carax's film Holy Motors.

Release
Indiscreet was released in October 1975, nearly a year after Sparks' previous album and would be the third album recorded with the British-based line-up.  It was not as successful as Kimono My House or Propaganda; reaching #18 on the UK Album Chart and #169 in the US.  The group's next two albums were even less successful in Europe and the US. They would not garner significant attention until 1979's No. 1 In Heaven.

"Get In The Swing" and "Looks, Looks, Looks" were released as singles. Like the parent album they were only moderately successful reaching #27 and #26 in the UK, which resulted in the Mael brothers splitting up the British-based version of Sparks and returning home to America.

Re-release
Indiscreet was re-issued and remastered by Island in 1994 and 2006. The first issue by the Island Masters subsidiary added the B-side "Profile" and the non-album single "I Wanna Hold Your Hand", and its B-side "England". The '21st Century Edition' did not include "I Wanna Hold Your Hand" or "England"; in their stead it included the rare "The Wedding of Jacqueline Kennedy to Russell Mael" and a live recording of "Looks, Looks, Looks".

Track listing

Personnel
Sparks
 Russell Mael – vocals
 Ron Mael – keyboards
 Ian Hampton – bass
 Trevor White – guitar
 Norman "Dinky" Diamond – drums
with:
 Mike Piggott – fiddle on "It Ain't 1918"
 Tony Visconti – orchestral arrangements

References 

Sparks (band) albums
1975 albums
Albums produced by Tony Visconti
Island Records albums